Eriogonum cithariforme is a species of wild buckwheat known by the common name cithara buckwheat.

It is endemic to the Transverse Ranges and Southern Outer California Coast Ranges of Southern California. It grows in sandy areas in a number of local habitat types, such as chaparral.

Description
Eriogonum cithariforme is an annual herb growing up to about half a meter in maximum height with a spreading or erect flowering stem with many upcurved branches.

The wavy, woolly leaves are round to oval in shape and are mainly located about the base of the stem. They are greenish in colour.

The inflorescence is lined with many clusters of white to pinkish flowers with a dark central stripe. At 3-4mm in size these flowers are large compared to most other genus members. In younger plants inflorescence clusters are limited to branch junctions, but in age clusters are born along the upper stem as well.

External links

Jepson Manual Treatment of Eriogonum cithariforme
Eriogonum cithariforme — Photo gallery

cithariforme
Endemic flora of California
Natural history of the California chaparral and woodlands
Natural history of the California Coast Ranges
Natural history of the Santa Monica Mountains
Natural history of the Transverse Ranges
Flora without expected TNC conservation status